David Miles Grylls (born September 29, 1957) is a retired track cyclist from the United States. He represented his native country at the 1984 Summer Olympics in Los Angeles, California, where he won the silver medal in the men's 4000 m team pursuit, alongside Steve Hegg, Leonard Nitz, Patrick McDonough and Brent Emery. He now coaches junior cyclists at the San Diego Velodrome.

References

External links
 
 
 

1957 births
Living people
American track cyclists
American male cyclists
Cyclists at the 1984 Summer Olympics
Olympic silver medalists for the United States in cycling
Place of birth missing (living people)
Medalists at the 1984 Summer Olympics
Cyclists at the 1983 Pan American Games
Pan American Games gold medalists for the United States
Pan American Games medalists in cycling
Medalists at the 1983 Pan American Games
20th-century American people
21st-century American people